This is a list of Alliance MPs. It includes all Members of Parliament elected to the British House of Commons representing the Alliance Party of Northern Ireland. Defections are also included.

List

Footnotes

References

Alliance Party of Northern Ireland
Lists of United Kingdom MPs by party